is a , 50-story educational facility located in the Nishi-Shinjuku district in Shinjuku, Tokyo, Japan. The building is home to three educational institutions: Tokyo Mode Gakuen (fashion vocational school), HAL Tokyo (special technology and design college), and Shuto Ikō (medical college). Completed in October 2008, the tower is the second-tallest educational building in the world and was the 17th-tallest building in Tokyo. It was awarded the 2008 Skyscraper of the Year by Emporis.

Design
Mode Gakuen invited architects to compete to build its new Tokyo location, stipulating that the building could not be rectangular. About 50 architects submitted more than 150 proposals. The winner had a curved shell of white aluminum and dark blue glass, criss-crossed by a web of white diagonal lines. The architects, Tange Associates, said its cocoon-like shape symbolizes nurturing the students inside; they also said they wanted the building to revitalize the surrounding area and to create a gateway between Shinjuku Station and the Shinjuku central business district. The building earned the firm the Emporis 2008 Skyscraper of the year award.

Facilities
Built on the former site of the now-demolished Asahi Life headquarters, construction of the Mode Gakuen Cocoon Tower began in May 2006 and was completed in October 2008. The -tall, 50-story tower is the second-tallest educational building in the world (surpassed only by the main building of the Moscow State University) and was the 17th-tallest building in Tokyo. The vertical campus can accommodate 10,000 students for the three vocational schools that occupy the building. Tokyo Mode Gakuen, for which the building in named after, is a fashion school. The other schools, HAL Tokyo and Shuto Ikō, are information technology and medical schools, respectively, that are operated by Mode Gakuen University. Each floor of the tower contains three rectangular classrooms that surround an inner core. The inner core consists of an elevator, a staircase and a support shaft. Every three floors, a three-story student lounge is located between the classrooms and faces three directions: east, southwest and northwest.

See also
Mode Gakuen Spiral Towers
30 St Mary Axe

References

External links 
 

Commercial buildings completed in 2008
High-tech architecture
Lattice shell structures
Skyscrapers in Shinjuku
Shimizu Corporation
2008 establishments in Japan